Susanna Ivashyna (born 30 June 1972) is a Belarusian female curler. She is right-handed.

Achievements
Belarusian Mixed Curling Championship: gold (2018).

Teams and events

Women's

Mixed

Mixed doubles

References

External links

Вне игры: Сюзанна Ивашина — Белорусская ассоциация керлинга

1972 births
Living people
Belarusian female curlers
Belarusian curling champions